African swine flu may refer to:

 2009 swine flu pandemic in Africa
 African swine fever, sometimes incorrectly referred to as flu